Sunalta Station is a CTrain light rail station in Calgary, Alberta, Canada. It serves the West segment of the Blue Line.

The station is located on an elevated guideway, constructed on the south side of the CPR mainline. It is located near 16 Street SW and the communities of Sunalta, Connaught, Scarboro and Downtown West, 1.1 km West of the 7 Avenue & 9 Street SW Interlocking.

Inside the station building, escalators, stairs and an elevator provide access to the mezzanine level where the pedestrian overpass connects the station to Bow Trail and the Greyhound Bus Depot. From the mezzanine level, a further two sets of escalators, stairs, and elevators provide access up to the side-loading platform.

Sunalta is the first elevated station in the CTrain system and is the only station currently planned this way. An Area Redevelopment Plan for the station's surroundings was approved by City Council in March 2010.

In its first year of service, Sunalta served an average of 5,640 boardings per day.

History 
Construction on Sunalta station began on July 14, 2010. The ceremonial opening was held on December 9, 2012, and on December 10, the station, and the West LRT project as a whole, opened for revenue.

On April 29, 2017, a fatal stabbing occurred at Sunalta station.

Crime 
Sunalta Station has been criticized for being a crime hotspot in the Calgary C-Train System. On a CityNews interview in January 2022 with Calgary Transit Lead Staff 'Stephen Tauro', it was listed as one of the 5 stations with an unusually high crime rate. The others being: Marlborough, Rundle, Southland and Heritage Stations.

Notable places nearby
Shaw Millennium skatepark
Sunalta Station Place
10 Avenue SW Business Corridor

References

CTrain stations
Railway stations in Canada opened in 2012
2012 establishments in Alberta